A knot is a fastening in rope or interwoven lines.

Knot may also refer to:

Places
 Knot, Nancowry, a village in India

Archaeology
 Knot of Isis (tyet), symbol of welfare/life.
 Minoan snake goddess figurines#Sacral knot

Arts, entertainment, and media

Films
 Knots (film), a 2004 film starring Scott Cohen and Annabeth Gish
 Knots, a 2011 film starring Kimberly-Rose Wolter

Music
 Rosette (music), soundhole decoration on string instruments
 Knots (Sons of Noel and Adrian album), a 2012 album by Sons of Noel and Adrian
 Knots (Crash of Rhinos album), a 2013 album by Crash of Rhinos
 Knots (EP), a 2018 extended play by Moira Dela Torre and Nieman Gatus
 "Knots", a song by Gentle Giant

Other uses in arts, entertainment, and media
 KNOT, a radio station in Prescott, Arizona, United States
 Knots, a 1970 book of poetry by R. D. Laing

Biology
 Red knot, a wading bird (simply called "knot" in Europe)
 Great knot, a wading bird
 Trigger point or knot, a small, hard, tender spot in a muscle
Bulbus glandis or knot, an erectile swelling on a canid penis

Mathematics
 Knot (mathematics), an abstract representation of an interwoven linear object
 Knot (graph theory), an inescapable section of a directed graph
 Knot (regression), points on a spline
 Knot theory, the study of mathematical knots

Other uses
 Knot (heraldry), design incorporating a knot
 Knot (papermaking), a clump of fibres in paper pulp
 Knot (unit), of speed
 Knot (wood), a timber imperfection
 Knot DNS, software
 Cometary knots in planetary nebulae

See also
 Knott (disambiguation)
 Celtic knot, a decorative graphic representation of a knot
 Gordian Knot, a very complex knot in Ancient Greek mythology
 Garlic knot, a bread appetiser in the shape of a knot
 Knot garden, an elaborate interlace of tightly clipped low hedging
 Knotted wrack, a seaweed
 Knotgrass or knotweed, any of the plants in the buckwheat family, Polygonaceae
 Knotting, Bedfordshire, a village in England
Knots Landing, an American soap opera
 Mary Untier of Knots, a Marian devotion
 The Knot (disambiguation)